Klaus Doldinger (born 12 May 1936) is a German saxophonist known for his work in  jazz and as a film music composer. He was the recipient of 1997's Bavarian Film Awards.

Life and work
Doldinger was born in Berlin, Germany, and entered a Düsseldorf conservatory in 1947, originally studying piano and then clarinet, graduating in 1957. In his student years, Doldinger gained professional performing experience, starting in 1953 in the German Dixieland band The Feetwarmers, and recording with them in 1955. Later that year he founded Oscar's Trio' modeled on Oscar Peterson's work. During the 1960s, he worked as a tenor saxophonist, working with visiting American jazz musicians, Beat groups like Ian and the Zodiacs and recording in his own right.

Doldinger's recurring jazz project Passport, started in 1971 (then called "Klaus Doldinger's Passport"), still enjoys success in Germany. In its influence it was sometimes called the European version of Weather Report.

At various times members of Passport included Peter O'Mara (guitar), Roberto DiGioia (keyboards), Patrick Scales (bass, since 1994), Ernst Stroer (:de:Ernst Ströer) (percussion, since 1989), Christian Lettner (drums, since 2000), Michael Hornek (keyboard since 2009), Biboul Darouiche (percussion, since 1995) and others. Guests include Brian Auger (1973), Johnny Griffin (1973) and Pete York (1973). The first true Passport album had strong ties to Amon Düül II, containing contributions from Olaf Kübler, Lothar Meid and Jimmy Jackson.

Doldinger contributed film scores to the German U-boat film Das Boot (1981) and later The NeverEnding Story (1984). He also composed the musical theme of the long ongoing German-Austrian-Swiss series, Tatort (Crime scene).

Doldinger married Inge Beck in 1960; they have three children, Viola, Melanie and Nicolas Doldinger. Since 1968, they have resided in Icking, a small Bavarian village, south of Munich. On 1 September 2022 he released his autobiography Made in Germany.

Selected film and TV scores
 (1968)
The Naughty Cheerleader (1970)
Baal (1970)
Tatort (1970–)
The Net (1975)
To the Bitter End (1975)
The Swiss Conspiracy (1976)
The Old Fox (1977–)
The Second Awakening of Christa Klages (1978)
Ein Fall für zwei (1981–2013)
Das Boot (1981)
The Roaring Fifties (1983)
The Neverending Story (1984)
Nonni and Manni (1988)
Peter in Magicland (1990)
Salt on Our Skin (1992)
Palmetto (1998)

References

External links
Official website
Fan site (archived)

2004 interview in Jazzdimensions (archived)

1936 births
Living people
German jazz composers
Male jazz composers
German jazz saxophonists
Male saxophonists
Jazz fusion musicians
Post-bop jazz musicians
German film score composers
Male film score composers
German male composers
ACT Music artists
Officers Crosses of the Order of Merit of the Federal Republic of Germany
20th-century German composers
21st-century German composers
Musicians from Berlin
Robert Schumann Hochschule alumni
20th-century saxophonists
21st-century saxophonists
20th-century German male musicians
21st-century German male musicians
Passport (band) members
Musical groups from Berlin
20th-century jazz composers
21st-century jazz composers